Detlof Sigismund von Winterfeldt (28 May 1867 – 29 November 1940) was a German officer and military attaché who represented the German Army as a signatory of the Armistice of 11 November 1918, which concluded the hostilities of World War I.

Biography 
Winterfeldt was born in Berlin and received his commission as an officer in 1888 after attending the Prussian Staff College. Between 1901 and 1905, he served as military attaché in Brussels, and later served the same role in Paris between 1909 and 1914.

After the outbreak of World War I, Winterfeldt left Paris in August 1914 to serve as quartermaster to the 8th Army, with the rank of Oberst. From August 1917 to November 1918, he was representative of the Supreme Army Command to the Chancellor, with the rank of Generalmajor.

In November 1918, Winterfeldt was a delegate to the armistice negotiations between Germany and the Allied Powers, led by Matthias Erzberger. Winterfeldt was one of the four German signatories in the resulting agreement, which ended the hostilities of the war.

Winterfeldt died in Berlin in 1940 and is buried at the Invalids' Cemetery.

References

External links 

 Detlof von Winterfeldt at the German National Archives

1867 births
1940 deaths
German Army personnel of World War I
Military personnel from Berlin